Edward Venables-Vernon-Harcourt (10 October 1757 – 5 November 1847) was a Church of England bishop. He was the Bishop of Carlisle from 1791 to 1807 and then the Archbishop of York until his death.

He was the third son of the George Venables-Vernon, 1st Baron Vernon (1709–1780), and assumed the additional name of Harcourt on succeeding to the property of his cousin, the last Earl Harcourt, in 1831.

Biography
Edward Venables-Vernon was born at Sudbury Hall, Derbyshire on 10 October 1757. He was educated at Westminster School; matriculated at Christ Church, Oxford on 2 July 1774; was elected fellow of All Souls College in 1777 and graduated B.C.L. 27 April 1786, and D.C.L., 4 May following. After his ordination he was instituted to the family living of Sudbury. He became a canon of Christ Church, Oxford, 13 October 1785, and a prebendary of Gloucester on 10 November in the same year . He resigned his prebendal stall in 1791, but held his other appointments to 1808.

On 18 August 1791 he was nominated as the Bishop of Carlisle in succession to John Douglas and was consecrated on 6 November following. For 16 years he administered the affairs of the see of Carlisle with good sense and discretion, spending more than the whole income of the see upon the wants of his diocese.

Archbishop of York

After the death of Archbishop William Markham. Venables-Vernon was nominated on 26 November 1807 as archbishop of York, and was confirmed in St. James's Church, Westminster on 19 January 1808. In the same year, on 20 January, he was gazetted a privy councillor, and made Lord High Almoner to George III, an office which he also held under Queen Victoria's reign.

According to the account of Dean Alford:
"Archbishop Harcourt was very fond of hunting, so fond that he was very near refusing the archbishopric because he thought if he accepted he should have to give it up. He consulted a friend, who said that he must take counsel with others. 'Of course I should never join the meet,’ said the Archbishop, 'but you know I might fall in with the hounds by accident.' After some time the friend came back and said that on the whole the party considered that the Archbishop might hunt, provided he did not shout."

Venables-Vernon was a member of the queen's council who had charge of George III during his illness. He was an eloquent speaker, and occasionally spoke in the House of Lords on ecclesiastical matters, but usually abstained from political contentions. He lived under five successive monarchs, and was respected for benevolence and simplicity of character. On 15 January 1831 he took the surname of Harcourt only on inheriting the large estates of the Harcourt family, which came to him on the death of his cousin, Field-marshal William, third and last Earl Harcourt.

In 1835 he was appointed one of the first members of the ecclesiastical commission. In 1838 he was offered the renewal of the Harcourt peerage, but declined it, not wishing to be fettered in his parliamentary votes. York Minster twice suffered fires during his primacy, 1829 and 1841, and he contributed largely to both restorations. Archbishop Harcourt preached his valedictory sermon in York Minster on 13 November 1838. However Harcourt continued to enjoy good health, and as late as 1 November 1847 visited York and inspected the repairs of the chapterhouse. He died at the palace, Bishopthorpe, near York, on 5 November 1847, and was buried at Stanton Harcourt, Oxfordshire, 13 November

A memorial to Harcourt was erected in York Minster in 1855 sculpted by Matthew Noble.

Family
On 5 February 1784 he married Lady Anne Leveson-Gower, third daughter of Granville Leveson-Gower, 1st Marquess of Stafford, and they had sixteen children. His wife predeceased him at Bishopthorpe Palace on 16 November 1832, aged 72.

His second son, the Revd. Leveson Vernon Harcourt, was chancellor of York, an author of The Doctrine of the Deluge and of other theological works. His fourth son was William Vernon Harcourt, the founder of the British Association for the Advancement of Science. Two of his sons became Admirals and his youngest daughter, Georgiana, distinguished herself as a translator.

The children included:
George Granville Vernon-Harcourt (6 Aug 1785 – 19 Dec 1861)
The Reverend Leveson Venables-Vernon-Harcourt (1788 – 26 Jul 1860)
Reverend William Vernon Harcourt (Jun 1789 – 1 Apr 1871)
Admiral Frederick Edward Vernon-Harcourt (15 Jun 1790 – 1 May 1883), forefather to the 11th Lord Vernon
Lt.-Col. Henry Venables-Vernon-Harcourt (1791 – 26 Feb 1853)
Granville Harcourt-Vernon (26 Jul 1792 – 8 Dec 1879)
Vice-Admiral Octavius Henry Cyril Harcourt (26 Dec 1793 – 14 Aug 1863)
The Reverend Charles Vernon-Harcourt (14 Nov 1798 – 10 Dec 1870)
Colonel Francis Venables-Vernon-Harcourt (6 Jan 1801 – 23 Apr 1880)
Egerton Vernon-Harcourt (1803 - 19 Oct 1883 Whitwell Hall, Yorkshire), who was a president of the United Debating Society in 1824 while educated at Christ Church, Oxford.
Louisa Augusta Venables-Vernon-Harcourt (c. 1804 – 4 Aug 1869), who married Sir John Vanden-Bempde-Johnstone, Baronet, of Hackness, on 14 June 1825 at St. George's, Hanover Square. He died 24 Feb 1869, the widow dying only a few months later on 4 Aug 1869, at Eridge Castle, Kent.
Georgiana Charlotte Frances Harcourt (1807–1886)

Cato Street conspiracy
As a director of the Ancient Concerts, Harcourt entertained his fellow-directors (the prince regent and Prince Adolphus – the Duke of Cambridge, the Duke of Cumberland (later the King of Hanover), and the Duke of Wellington) at his house in Grosvenor Square on 23 February 1821. On the same night the Cato Street conspirators had designed the murder of the cabinet ministers at the house adjoining Harcourt's, where the ministers had agreed to dine with Lord Harrowby.

Harcourt's publications
 A Sermon preached before the Lords on the Anniversary of the Martyrdom of King Charles the First, 1794.
 A Sermon preached before the Society for the Propagation of the Gospel, 1798.
 A Sermon preached at the Coronation of George IV, 1821, which was twice reprinted.

An account of the life of Margaret Godolphin who died in 1678 was written by John Evelyn and this was passed down through his family to Harcourt. Harcourt allowed it to be published in 1847 with the assistance of the Bishop of Oxford.

See also
Vernon Islands

References

Archbishops of York
Alumni of Christ Church, Oxford
1757 births
1847 deaths
Bishops of Carlisle
Fellows of All Souls College, Oxford
Edward
People educated at Westminster School, London
Younger sons of barons
18th-century Church of England bishops
19th-century Anglican archbishops
People from Sudbury, Derbyshire
18th-century Anglican theologians
19th-century Anglican theologians